The Blackstone Formation is a geologic formation of the Ipswich Coal Measures Group in southeastern Queensland, Australia, dating to the Carnian to Norian stages of the Late Triassic. The shales, siltstones, coal and tuffs were deposited in a lacustrine environment. The Blackstone Formation contains the Denmark Hill Insect Bed.

Fossil content

Vertebrates

Lungfish

Invertebrates

Ichnofossils 
In 1964, dinosaur footprints were discovered from the Rhondda colliery (underground coal mine) 230 metres below ground along the sandstone ceiling of the Striped Bacon coal seam. These were initially described as Eubrontes, a type of predatory dinosaur (theropod) footprint. Later, these footprints were considered as evidence for the world's largest Triassic theropod, with legs towering over 2 metres tall. A 3D evaluation of the fossil indicated the footprint length was much smaller than previously reported (34 cm rather than 46 cm long) and its shape was characteristic of the trace fossil genus (ichnogenus) Evazoum. The existing hypothesis is that Evazoum were made by prosauropods, ancestral forms of long-necked sauropod dinosaurs. The bipedal dinosaur track-maker may have resembled the dinosaur Plateosaurus, and this fossil is the only evidence of this group of dinosaurs in Australia. The next evidence for sauropodomorphs in Australia comes over 50 million years later in the Jurassic.

See also 
 List of fossil sites

References

Bibliography 
 

Geologic formations of Australia
Triassic Australia
Carnian Stage
Rhaetian Stage
Shale formations
Siltstone formations
Coal formations
Tuff formations
Lacustrine deposits
Ichnofossiliferous formations
Coal in Australia
Geology of Queensland
Ipswich, Queensland